Atok may refer to:

 ATOK software
 Atok, Benguet
Atok, Cameroon
 Atok barangay in Flora, Apayao